Cryptoglossini is a tribe of darkling beetles in the subfamily Pimeliinae of the family Tenebrionidae. There are at least three genera in Cryptoglossini, found in North America.

Genera
These genera belong to the tribe Cryptoglossini
 Asbolus LeConte, 1851
 Cryptoglossa Solier, 1837 (death-feigning beetles)
 Schizillus Horn, 1874

References

Further reading

 
 

Tenebrionoidea